En-sipad-zid-ana appears as the second king of Larak in some versions of the Sumerian King List (SKL). According to that literary composition, En-sipad-zid-ana ruled for 28,800 years. The kings on the early part of the SKL are usually not considered historical, except when they are mentioned in Early Dynastic documents. En-sipad-zid-ana is not one of them.

See also

History of Sumer
List of Mesopotamian dynasties

References

Bibliography

|-

Antediluvian Sumerian kings
Sumerian kings